Judy Brown (Pen Name:Eishes Chayil) is an American author. She is the recipient of Sydney Taylor Book Award and authored Hush, which was published in 2010. Kirkus named Hush one of the Best Books of the Year.

Biography
Eishes Chayil was born as Judy Brown, to Ruthie Lichtenstein, the publisher of Hamodia, the large hasidic-owned ultra-Orthodox daily newspaper.

Work

Hush
Brown chooses pen name Eishes Chayil (Women of valor) to protect her identity. Hush,her debut novel, tells the true story of sexual assault and its cover-up among ultra-Orthodox Jews. It has been labelled as a sensationalist exposé by some and praised by others for its Suspenseful Style.

Brown received major backlash from the community when she revealed her identity in a Huffington Post article in 2011.

This Is Not a Love Story:A memoir
In 2015, She published her second novel titled This Is Not a Love Story. It narrates a true story of how Chassidic community dealt with the autism of her brother.

References

Living people
American autobiographers
Women autobiographers
21st-century American women writers
Year of birth missing (living people)